Jane Wang may refer to:
Jane Wang (composer and musician)
Jane-Ling Wang, Chinese-American statistician
Q. Jane Wang, Chinese-American tribologist
Sue-Jane Wang, American biostatistician
Z. Jane Wang, Chinese-American researcher on insect flight
Zhen Jane Wang, Chinese-Canadian signal processing researcher